An election was held on 2 May 2019 to elect all 54 members of Tonbridge and Malling Borough Council. Parish council elections were held on the same day.

The Conservatives retained control of the council despite losing seats. The Green Party won their first seats on the council, winning 2 seats in Judd ward.

Summary

Election result

|-

 Valid ballot papers: 31,130 (98.6%)
 Rejected ballot papers: 431 (1.4%)
 Ballot papers issued: 31,561 (33.7%)
 Registered electors: 93,751

Ward results

By-elections

Castle

Kings Hill

West Malling & Leybourne

Notes

References

Tonbridge and Malling
2010s in Kent
2019
May 2019 events in the United Kingdom